The Karisoke Research Center is a research institute in Rwanda's Volcanoes National Park. It was founded by Dian Fossey on 24 September 1967 to study  endangered mountain gorillas. Fossey located the camp in Rwanda's Virunga volcanic mountain range, between Mount Karisimbi and Mount Bisoke, and named it by combining the names of the two mountains.

After Fossey's murder in December 1985, she was interred in the grounds of the institute. The camp subsequently continued to function under the auspices of the Dian Fossey Gorilla Fund International.  In 2012, Karisoke moved its headquarters to a more modern facility in Musanze.

At the time Fossey founded Karisoke, she feared that the mountain gorilla might become extinct by the end of the 20th century, as her mentor, Dr. Louis Leakey, had warned. A census published in 1981 found that the population had fallen to 242 individuals, from a 1960 estimate of 400–500.  , 45 years later, some 480 mountain gorillas are known to inhabit the Virunga mountains (according to a census), a significant increase. Karisoke survived Fossey's murder in 1985 as well as years of civil strife and also expanded tremendously over the past few decades.

History

Karisoke Under Dian Fossey

In his book A Forest in the Clouds, John Fowler describes Fossey's remote mountain gorilla camp, Karisoke Research Center, a few years prior to her gruesome murder, telling the often-shocking story of the unraveling of Fossey’s Rwandan facility as pressures mount in an effort to extricate Fossey from her domain. Instead of the intrepid scientist many admired in the pages of National Geographic magazine, Fowler shows Fossey as a chain-smoking, hard-drinking woman bullying her staff and students into submission in her efforts to hold onto to her reputation as scientist and savior of the mountain gorillas.[6]

Rwandan Genocide
The site was closed down during the genocide and civil war in Rwanda when most of the workers became refugees in neighboring Democratic Republic of Congo (formerly Zaire). Most Karisoke trackers lost their homes and possessions in the war, and some saw family members murdered. Some were imprisoned when they returned home. Rwandan staff continued to monitor the gorillas during this period whenever possible.

By 1998 Karisoke’s expatriate staff had evacuated five times. The facility was destroyed three times, rebuilt twice, and eventually relocated to Musanze (formerly Ruhengeri). Despite the constant threat of war, Karisoke continued to upgrade its capacity for scientific research through new technology and new partnerships with local authorities and other conservation organizations. The gorillas survived the war years in good condition, despite the greatly increased number of snares set by poachers.  The buildings, now in ruins and overgrown by vegetation, are still a monument to Fossey, her work and the first camp dedicated exclusively to the study of mountain gorillas. The Dian Fossey Gorilla Fund continues to operate the Karisoke Research Center, from its Regional Research Center headquarters in Musanze.

Current
Thanks to Karisoke Research Center's active conservation program, the mountain gorillas of the Virungas are the only great ape species to have increased in number in recent decades.

Karisoke conducts extensive daily protection and monitoring of the mountain gorillas, numerous science and research projects, various education initiatives, and community health and development projects. Since its establishment in 1967, Karisoke has produced an unparalleled amount of information about the mountain gorillas and their habitat and attracts scientists and science students from around the world.

Karisoke is also a significant resource for the people who live near the gorillas, employing more than 100 staff members, the great majority of whom are Rwandan. Over half of them are involved in research, protection, and monitoring of the gorillas. Others are engaged in biodiversity and socioeconomic research, education, health, and administration. In addition, Karisoke provides the human communities in the area with education, health, and economic development programs. Staff members provide conservation education to primary and secondary school students and to adult community members through a variety of media. The Fossey Fund supports and has helped renovate schools and a health clinic near the park and supports clean water, parasite treatment, and prevention programs that reduce transmission of disease from people to gorillas as well as improving the quality of life for the communities.

Ellen DeGeneres plans to help build a permanent home in Rwanda for the work of the Fossey Fund to protect critically endangered mountain gorillas. The Ellen DeGeneres Campus of the Fossey Gorilla Fund is to be a permanent, specially designed facility for scientists who are helping to save mountain gorillas.

References

6. Fowler, John (2018). A Forest in the Clouds: My Year Among the Mountain Gorillas in the Remote Enclave of Dian Fossey. Pegasus Books. ISBN 9781681776330.

Bibliography

External links 
Dian Fossey Gorilla Fund International

Research institutes established in 1967
Primate research centers
Nature conservation organisations based in Rwanda
1967 establishments in Rwanda
Research institutes in Rwanda